FastCAP or FastCap may refer to:

FastCAP, a type of combat air patrol to protect fighter strike aircraft
FastCap®, a brand of supercapacitors from the company Nanoramic®